Daltonganj Coalfield is located in Palamu district in the Indian state of Jharkhand.

Overview
There are three coalfields in the valley of the North Koel River: Auranga, Hutar and Daltonganj.

The Auranga Coalfield, spread across 240 km2, has coal of inferior quality, which is used mainly in cement kilns and brick kilns. The majority of coal in the  Hutar Coalfield, spread across 200 km2, is of inferior quality. The coal available near Rajhara from the Daltonganj coalfield, spread over 51 km2, is of semi-anthracite type. Elsewhere, it is non-coking coal of inferior variety.

Reserves
Total geological reserves of non-coking coal is 2997.11 million tonnes in Auranga Coalfield, 249.82 million tonnes in Hutar coalfield and 143.96 million tonnes in Daltonganj coalfield.

Projects

References

Coalfields of India
Mining in Jharkhand
Palamu district